Jarmundi is a village in the Jarmundi CD block in the Dumka Sadar subdivision of Dumka district in the Indian state of Jharkhand.

Geography

Location

In the map of Jarmundi CD block in the District Census Handbook, Dumka, Jarmundi is shown as being part of Basukinath Nagar Palika.

Overview
The map shows a large area, which is a plateau with low hills, except in the eastern portion where the Rajmahal hills intrude into this area and the Ramgarh hills are there. The south-western portion is just a rolling upland. The entire area is overwhelmingly rural with only small pockets of urbanisation.

Note: The full screen map is interesting. All places marked on the map are linked in the full screen map and one can easily move on to another page of his/her choice. Enlarge the full screen map to see what else is there – one gets railway connections, many more road connections and so on.

Civic administration

Police station
There is a police station at Jarmundi.

CD block HQ
Headquarters of Jarmundi CD block is at Jarmundi village.

Transport

Education
Baba Basukinath Parwati Inter College, at Basukinath, is a Hindi-medium coeducational institution established in 2000. It has facilities for teaching in classes XI and XII.

St. Joseph's School Jarmundi is a Hindi-medium coeducational institution. It has facilities for teaching from class I to class XII.

Model School Jarmundi is an English-medium coeducational institution established in 2011. It has facilities for teaching from class VI to class XII.

Culture
Hindus in large numbers gather at Basukuinath temple to worship Lord Shiva.

References

Villages in Dumka district